is a Japanese sprint canoer who has competed since the mid-2000s. She won a bronze medal in the K-1 200 m event at the 2010 ICF Canoe Sprint World Championships in Poznań, the first person from Japan to medal at the world championships.

Competing in three Summer Olympics (Athens 2004, Beijing 2008 and London 2012), Kitamoto earned her best finish of fifth in the K-2 500 m event at Beijing in 2008.

World Cup Racice 2010 k1 500m gold medal

External links
Sports-Reference.com profile

1977 births
Canoeists at the 2004 Summer Olympics
Canoeists at the 2008 Summer Olympics
Canoeists at the 2012 Summer Olympics
Japanese female canoeists
Living people
Olympic canoeists of Japan
Asian Games medalists in canoeing
ICF Canoe Sprint World Championships medalists in kayak
Canoeists at the 1998 Asian Games
Canoeists at the 2002 Asian Games
Canoeists at the 2006 Asian Games
Canoeists at the 2010 Asian Games
Medalists at the 2002 Asian Games
Medalists at the 2006 Asian Games
Medalists at the 2010 Asian Games
Asian Games gold medalists for Japan
Asian Games silver medalists for Japan
Asian Games bronze medalists for Japan